Branchiosaurinae is an extinct subfamily of temnospondyl amphibians, part of the family Branchiosauridae. It includes all members of Branchiosauridae except Tungussogyrinus.

References

Carboniferous temnospondyls
Permian temnospondyls
Branchiosaurids
Taxa named by Antonin Fritsch